The  is a single-car diesel multiple unit (DMU) train type operated by West Japan Railway Company (JR-West) on its rural lines in Japan. Based on Niigata Tekkō's "NDC" lightweight diesel car design intended for third sector operators (such as Matsuura Railway, Takachiho Railway, and Kumagawa Railway), a total of 89 cars were built, with the class divided into three sub-classes: KiHa 120-0, KiHa 120-200, and KiHa 120-300.

Variants

KiHa 120-200
Eight first-batch cars were built in 1992. These had painted steel bodies, two-pane windows, transverse and longitudinal seating, and no toilets. All cars were later modified with the addition of toilets.

KiHa 120-0
22 second-batch cars were built in 1993, including three cars built at JR-West's Gotō Works. These had uprated engines, stainless steel bodies, single-pane windows, longitudinal seating, and no toilets. All cars were later modified with the addition of toilets.

KiHa 120-300
59 third-batch cars were built between 1994 and 1996, including 19 cars built at JR-West's Gotō Works. These were similar in design to the KiHa 120-0 subclass, but were built with some transverse seating. Although not initially built with toilets, all cars were modified with the addition of toilets from 2005.

Livery variations

References

120
West Japan Railway Company
Train-related introductions in 1991
Niigata Transys rolling stock